Kapi, Kapı, or KAPI may refer to:

Places 
 Kapi, Estonia, a village in Estonia
 Kapı, Karataş, a village in Turkey
 a possible old volcanic eruption site near Krakatoa

People
 Mari Kapi (1950–2009), Papua New Guinean judge 
 Mustafa Kapı (born 2002), Turkish footballer

Other uses 
 Kapi (car), a Spanish car in the 1950s
 Kapi (mammal), a genus of prehistoric primates
 Kapi (raga), in Carnatic music
 KAPI, an American Family Radio station
 Shrimp paste, known as kapi in Laotian, Khmer, and Thai
 Kappa Alpha Pi (professional), or KAPI, a co-ed pre-law fraternity

See also 

 Capi (disambiguation)